Rear Admiral Christopher John Parry,   (born 29 November 1953) is a British retired Royal Navy officer who was the first chair of the British Government's Marine Management Organisation until November 2010.

Education
Parry was educated at Portsmouth Grammar School, Jesus College, Oxford, where he read modern history, and the University of Reading, where his Doctor of Philosophy degree was awarded in 2017 for a thesis titled "Do Norman Dixon's theories about incompetence apply to senior naval commanders?"

Naval career
Parry joined the Royal Navy as a seaman officer in 1972 and then became an observer in the Fleet Air Arm in 1979. In 1982, he was mentioned in despatches for his actions during the Falklands War, his part in rescuing sixteen SAS troopers from Fortuna Glacier in South Georgia and for the detection and disabling of the Argentinian submarine Santa Fe. He believes depth charges he launched were the first "shots" fired in the recapture of the Falklands.

In 1989, he was promoted to commander. He commanded the air defence destroyer  and the Maritime Warfare Centre. As a commodore, he was Director Operational Capability in the Ministry of Defence (2000–2003) and then Commander Amphibious Task Group from September 2003. He was appointed Commander of the Order of the British Empire (CBE) in the 2004 Birthday Honours. He was promoted to rear admiral in January 2005 when he became Director General, Development, Concepts and Doctrine, a role he held until 2008.

Recent activities
Since June 2008, Parry has worked in the private sector and as a writer, broadcaster and speaker. He served as the first chair of the British Government's Marine Management Organisation from April 2010 to November 2010.

On 12 June 2010, in an interview on BBC Radio 4's Today programme, he described the planning for the UK's 2006 deployment of 3,300 troops to Helmand Province in Afghanistan as flawed, relying too much on lessons from Borneo, Malaya and Northern Ireland. The subsequent BBC News article quotes him as saying that senior commanders had obdurately resisted "ditching the lessons from the past", preferring these to the "radical and progressive ideas" which were needed.

Works

References

1953 births
Living people
Alumni of Jesus College, Oxford
Commanders of the Order of the British Empire
Naval War College Review people
People educated at The Portsmouth Grammar School
Military personnel from Portsmouth
Royal Navy rear admirals
Royal Navy personnel of the Falklands War